The AROS Public License (APL) is software license which is primarily used for distribution of the AROS Research Operating System software project. Version 1.1 is based on the text of Mozilla Public License 1.1 with some definitions added and Netscape-specific texts changes.

It has not been officially approved as a free or open source license by the FSF, OSI, or Debian. The license the APL is based on, MPL v1.1, is incompatible with the GPL, unless the developer offers the choice of licensing the program under the GPL or any other GPL-compatible license.

References

External links 
 AROS Public License
 AROS License DFSG ok? Debian legal, 2005

Free and open-source software licenses